Jiří Novák (born 6 June 1950 in Jaroměř) is a former Czechoslovak ice hockey player. He participated at the 1976 Winter Olympics in Innsbruck, where his team won a silver medal, as well as the 1980 Winter Olympics.

References

External links
 
 
 
 
 

1950 births
Living people
Olympic ice hockey players of Czechoslovakia
Olympic medalists in ice hockey
Olympic silver medalists for Czechoslovakia
Ice hockey players at the 1976 Winter Olympics
Ice hockey players at the 1980 Winter Olympics
HC Dukla Jihlava players
HC Dynamo Pardubice players
People from Jaroměř
Sportspeople from the Hradec Králové Region
Czechoslovak expatriate sportspeople in France
Czechoslovak expatriate sportspeople in Italy
Czechoslovak expatriate sportspeople in Switzerland
Czechoslovak expatriate ice hockey people
Expatriate ice hockey players in Italy
Expatriate ice hockey players in France
Expatriate ice hockey players in Switzerland
Czechoslovak ice hockey centres
Czech ice hockey centres